Cisthene phaeoceps is a moth of the family Erebidae. It was described by George Hampson in 1900. It is found in Mexico.

References

Cisthenina
Moths described in 1900